Zhiwei Yun (born September 1982) is a Professor of Mathematics at MIT specializing in number theory, algebraic geometry and representation theory, with a particular focus on the Langlands program.

He was previously a C. L. E. Moore instructor at Massachusetts Institute of Technology from 2010 to 2012, assistant professor then associate professor at Stanford University from 2012 to 2016, and professor at Yale University from 2016 to 2017.

Education
Yun was born in Changzhou, China. As a high schooler, he participated in the International Mathematical Olympiad in 2000; he received a gold medal with a perfect score. Yun received his bachelor's degree from Peking University in 2004. In 2009, he received his Ph.D. from Princeton University, under the direction of Robert MacPherson.

Work
His collaborations with Wei Zhang, Xinyi Yuan and Xinwen Zhu have received attention in publications such as Quanta Magazine and Business Insider. In particular, his work with Wei Zhang on the Taylor expansion of L-functions is "already being hailed as one of the most exciting breakthroughs in an important area of number theory in the last 30 years."

Yun also made substantial contributions towards the global Gan–Gross–Prasad conjecture.

Awards
Yun was awarded the SASTRA Ramanujan Prize in 2012 for his "fundamental contributions to several areas that lie at the interface of representation theory, algebraic geometry and number theory."

In December 2017, he was awarded 2018 New Horizons In Mathematics Prize together with Wei Zhang, Aaron Naber and Maryna Viazovska.

He was included in the 2019 class of fellows of the American Mathematical Society "for contributions to geometry, number theory, and representation theory, including his construction of motives with exceptional Galois groups". In 2019 he received the Morningside Medal jointly with Xinwen Zhu.

Selected publications 
 
 (with Davesh Maulik) 
 
 (with Roman Bezrukavnikov) 
 (with Ngô Bảo Châu and Jochen Heinloth) 
 
 
 
 
 (with Alexei Oblomkov) 
 (with Wei Zhang)

References

1982 births
Living people
Number theorists
Recipients of the SASTRA Ramanujan Prize
21st-century Chinese mathematicians
Princeton University alumni
Scientists from Changzhou
International Mathematical Olympiad participants
Mathematicians from Jiangsu
Peking University alumni
Fellows of the American Mathematical Society
Massachusetts Institute of Technology School of Science faculty
Chinese science writers
Writers from Changzhou
Educators from Changzhou